Očevlje is a village in the municipality of Breza, Bosnia and Herzegovina. According to the 1991 census, there were 47 inhabitants in the settlement.

Demographics 
According to the 2013 census, its population was nil, down from 47 in 1991.

Notable people 
 Obren Joksimović, Serbian surgeon and politician

References

Populated places in Breza, Bosnia and Herzegovina